The Barmaley (Russian: Бармалей) is an informal name of a fountain in the city of Volgograd (formerly known as Stalingrad). Its official name is Children's Khorovod (Round Dance). The statue is of a circle of six children dancing the khorovod around a crocodile. While the original fountain was removed in the 1950s, two replicas were installed in 2013.

History
The original fountain is believed to have been installed in the 1930s, when the Soviet Union was being adorned with various outdoor architectural works, including similar fountains designed by sculptor Romuald Iodko, a co-author of the Girl with an Oar, an archetype of the Soviet kitsch. The Barmaley Fountain was made widely known from several August 1942 photographs by Emmanuil Evzerikhin that juxtaposed the carnage of the Battle of Stalingrad with the image of children at play.

The fountain was restored after World War II and was removed in the 1950s. A replica was installed at the original site for the 23 August 2013, 71st anniversary of the Battle of Stalingrad.

Two replicas of the fountain were installed in 2013 at different locations in Volgograd, one of them nearby the very same railway station. A terrorist attack in December 2013 once more placed the fountain against the scene of destruction, reminiscent of the wartime photo.

Another replica was installed near the Gergardt Mill.

The statue featured prominently in the films Enemy at the Gates, Stalingrad and a similar statue was seen in V for Vendetta. It is also seen in the film A Clockwork Orange, in the documentary footage shown to the main character Alex as part of the sinister aversion therapy to "cure" him of "ultra-violence".

In December 1943, Edith Segal's choreographed work, The Magic Fountain, inspired by the picture of the fountain was held at Carnegie Hall.

Name
The allegory of the monument was derived from the eponymous fairy tale poem Barmaley written in 1925 by Korney Chukovsky. Excerpt (literal translation):

While being burned in fire by Barmaley, Doctor Aybolit asked a crocodile brought in by a gorilla to swallow up Barmaley, so that he could no longer harm little children. The crocodile did so, but Barmaley was later released after promising to change. Barmaley became nicer and proclaimed he would be kinder, that he now loved little children and would become a friendly baker.

References

External links

Monuments and memorials built in the Soviet Union
Fountains in Russia
Rebuilt buildings and structures in Russia
Monuments and memorials in Volgograd